Frank Noel George (26 December 1897 – 1929) was an English footballer in the 1910s and 1920s who played as a goalkeeper.

Early career and Army
Born in Lichfield, he started playing as a forward with Hednesford Town before joining the Royal Army Service Corps in World War I. It was during his days in the army that he switched to the goalkeeper position.

Wolverhampton Wanderers
George was signed by Wolverhampton Wanderers (Wolves) in the summer of 1919, making his senior debut in February 1921 in an FA Cup replay against Derby County. Wolves were to go on and make the final of the competition that season, and George played in the final, which was lost to Tottenham Hotspur.

He established himself as the Wolves keeper, and was an ever-present in the 1921–22, 1923–24 and 1924–25 seasons, and in all he made 242 senior competitive appearances for Wolves, 222 of which were in The Football League. He kept a total of 73 clean sheets for Wolves.

Illness and death
George started to miss a number of games through injury in the 1925–26 and 1926–27 seasons and by November 1927 he was in the early stages of a terminal illness, and he retired in 1928. It was diagnosed as a disease of the gums and he died in 1929. His manager at Wolves, Frank Buckley, was convinced that his death was a result of ill-fitting dentures and thus from then on he ensured any of his players with dentures made regular visits to the dentist.

Honours
Wolverhampton Wanderers
FA Cup finalists: 1921
Football League Third Division North champions: 1923–24

References

1897 births
1929 deaths
Sportspeople from Lichfield
Association football goalkeepers
English Football League players
Hednesford Town F.C. players
Wolverhampton Wanderers F.C. players
British Army personnel of World War I
English footballers
Royal Army Service Corps soldiers
FA Cup Final players